Edmond Bonan (born 27 January 1937 in Haifa, Mandatory Palestine) is a French mathematician, known particularly for his work on special holonomy.

Biography 
After  completing his undergraduate studies at the École polytechnique, Bonan went on to write his 1967  University of Paris doctoral dissertation in Differential geometry under the supervision of  André Lichnerowicz. From 1968 to 1997, he held the post of lecturer and then professor at the University of Picardie Jules Verne in Amiens, where he currently holds the title of professor emeritus. Early in his career, from 1969 to 1981, he also lectured at the École Polytechnique.

See also 
G2 manifold
G2 structure
Spin(7) manifold
Holonomy
Quaternion-Kähler manifold
Calibrated geometry
Hypercomplex manifold
Hyperkähler manifold
Uniform polyhedron

References 

20th-century French mathematicians
21st-century French mathematicians
Differential geometers
Topologists
Relativity theorists
Academic staff of the University of Paris
École Polytechnique alumni
1937 births
Living people